Octocat may refer to:

 Octocat, the mascot of the source-code hosting service GitHub
 Octocat, part cat, part octopus character in Spliced (TV series)
 Octocat Adventure, a five-part animated video by David OReilly (artist)